Panther Lake is a  lake located on Vancouver Island on Forbidden Plateau south of Lake Helen MacKenzie.

References

Alberni Valley
Lakes of Vancouver Island
Comox Land District